GARO Project is a Japanese musical ensemble made up of the cast of the Garo television series. As a group, they released two singles in 2006 that featured the ending themes of the TV series and the made-for-TV movie Garo Special: Byakuya no Maju.

Members
Masaki Kyomoto: Producer, lyricist, composer, and guitarist. Portrayed Ryuzaki Karune/Barago/Kiba in Garo.
Hiroki Konishi: Vocals. Portrayed Kouga Saezima/Garo in Garo.
Ray Fujita: Vocals and chorus. Portrayed Rei Suzumura/Zero in Garo.
Mika Hijii: Chorus. Portrayed Kaoru Mitsuki in Garo.
Hiroyuki Watanabe: Drums and chorus. Portrayed Taiga Saezima/former Garo in Garo.

Discography
 - July 26, 2006
C/W 
 - November 26, 2006
C/W

External links
News releases at Masaki Kyomoto's official website
Official profile at Tricycle Entertainment (defunct)
Masaki Kyomoto's profile at Tricycle Entertainment

Garo (TV series)